
Gmina Konopnica is a rural gmina (administrative district) in Wieluń County, Łódź Voivodeship, in central Poland.

The gmina contains part of the protected area called Warta-Widawka Landscape Park.

Villages
Gmina Konopnica contains the villages and settlements of Anielin, Bębnów, Głuchów, Kamyk, Konopnica, Mała Wieś, Piaski, Rychłocice, Sabinów, Strobin, Szynkielów and Wrońsko.

Neighbouring gminas
Gmina Konopnica is bordered by the gminas of Burzenin, Osjaków, Ostrówek, Rusiec, Widawa and Złoczew.

References
Polish official population figures 2006

Konopnica
Wieluń County